, also known by his Chinese style name , was a bureaucrat of Ryukyu Kingdom.

Takehara was a descendant of Aragusuku Anki. He was the third son of Aragusuku Anjū, and was the originator of an aristocrat family, Mō-uji Misato Dunchi.

Takehara served as a member of sanshikan from 1690 to 1697. He was appointed 
 and sent to Kume Island in 1690, there he promulgated the memorandum, . He was granted Misato magiri (modern part of Okinawa, Okinawa) as his hereditary fief in 1697.

Takehara was a son-in-law of King Shō Shitsu. He had two famous sons: the eldest son Misato Anman and the third son Tomoyose Anjō. One later became a member of sanshikan; the other plotted to overthrow Sai On together with Heshikiya Chōbin, and was executed by crucifixion.

References

|-

1651 births
1697 deaths
Ueekata
Sanshikan
People of the Ryukyu Kingdom
Ryukyuan people
17th-century Ryukyuan people